

Raul Arias Espinoza Airport  is a domestic airport serving Contadora Island, in Panama's Pearl Islands archipelago.

The runway crosses the width of the island. Approaches to either end are over the water. There is a tight parking apron on the north end.

Airlines and destinations

See also

Transport in Panama
List of airports in Panama

References

External links
OpenStreetMap - Contadora Island
OurAirports - Contadora Airport

ASN - Runway excursion

Airports in Panama
Panama City